The American School of Asunción (commonly known locally as ASA) is an American private international school in Asunción, Paraguay.

Established in 1954, the school offers an instructional program from pre-kindergarten through grade 12. The school is a bilingual, multi-cultural educational institution which incorporates U.S. and Paraguayan culture, history, language, pedagogy, and values in an educational program for United States, international, and Paraguayan students alike.

The school is accredited in the United States by the Southern Association of Colleges and Schools (SACS) and recognized in Paraguay by the Ministry of Education and Culture. ASA is also a member of the Association of American Schools in South America (AASSA) and recognized by the U.S. Office of Overseas Schools (A.O.S.).

Curriculum 
The school offers a college-preparatory program using a standards-based curriculum. The program emphasizes excellence in the "Three A's" (athletics, academics, and the arts) through cooperative learning, critical thinking, problem solving and whole language, as well as to bilingualism and cultural diversity. All students in grades 1-12 are required to study Spanish. Students can graduate with both a U.S. High School Diploma and Paraguayan Studies Diploma. Each grade level is limited to 48 students and is divided into 2 sections.

Sports 
The school offers a sports program for various sports including: Soccer, Basketball, Futsal, Swimming, Volleyball, Martial Arts, and Track and Field. ASA also includes various after school clubs to participate in like the Chess Club, a  popular one.

References

External links 
 

Asunción
Schools in Asunción
Association of American Schools in South America
Educational institutions established in 1954
1954 establishments in Paraguay